Jordan Barrington Stewart (born 3 March 1982) is an English former professional footballer who played as a left-back or left winger.

Stewart started his career at Leicester City, where he was relegated twice and once promoted to the Premier League. Whilst at Leicester he also spent a loan spell at Bristol Rovers. He joined Watford in 2005, and was part of a side that won promotion to Premier League, before being subsequently relegated. He left the club in 2008 and subsequently signed for Derby. In March 2013 he signed a three-month contract with Coventry City on a free transfer. He subsequently spent four seasons in the Major League Soccer with San Jose Earthquakes and one season in the USL Championship with Phoenix Rising.

Club career

Leicester City
Stewart started his career at Leicester City, signing professional terms in the summer of 1999. He made his debut for the club against West Ham United on 22 January 2000. He made one more appearance for Leicester that season before being loaned to Division Two side Bristol Rovers, for whom he made four appearances. Semi-regular appearances from the bench followed in the 2001–02 season, before he established himself as a member of the first-team in 2002–03, after the club's relegation to Division One.

On 4 August 2002, Stewart scored the first goal at Leicester's new Walkers Stadium, in a friendly match with Athletic Bilbao. Leicester's return to the Premiership in 2003–04 saw fewer games for Stewart, although he did score a memorable goal against Manchester City at the City of Manchester Stadium in Leicester's 3–0 win in November 2003. Relegation again saw Stewart hold down a starting position in 2004–05.

Watford
Stewart became Aidy Boothroyd's first signing for Watford, joining for £125,000 in July 2005. He started as Watford's first-choice left-back, but was dropped in October 2005 after a run of poor form. He retook the position from James Chambers in January, and started every game until he was dropped for the game against Wolverhampton Wanderers on 14 April 2006, after another run of poor form. However, he returned to the side as they went on to win the Championship play-offs, playing all three games. He was the only player in Watford's squad to appear in every single match in 2005–06.

Stewart was a first-team regular through the club's 2006–07 Premiership campaign. Pre-season press speculation linked Stewart with a move to Rangers, but no move came to fruition.

Watford were relegated, and started their 2007–08 Championship season away at Wolverhampton Wanderers. Stewart scored his first goal for the club, a deflected free-kick, to equalise in an eventual 2–1 win. Up to the end of 2007, he started every league game in the campaign. He scored his second goal for the club on his 26th birthday, in a 2–2 draw away at Burnley. On 7 May 2008, Watford announced ahead of their play-off game with Hull City that they had agreed to release Stewart early from his contract.

Derby County
On 30 May 2008, Stewart, along with former Watford teammate Nathan Ellington, signed for Derby County. He signed a three-year contract with the club, who had just been relegated from the Premier League.

Stewart started the 2008–09 season as second choice left back, behind Jay McEveley, but soon established himself as first choice. With McEveley joining Preston and Charlton on loan, he became an ever-present in the Derby side. Stewart scored his first goal for Derby in the 3–0 win over Sheffield Wednesday, a stunning 30-yard strike. In his next home game, he scored another spectacular goal, this one coming against Preston. Once McEveley had returned from his loan spells at the end of January, he re-established himself as first choice left back and after Derby's FA Cup defeat to Manchester United, Stewart only played one more game for the first team, against Charlton on 25 April. Even with McEveley suffering an injury that ruled him out for the season in early April, Stewart was unable to re-establish himself as Lewin Nyatanga was preferred at left back.

Sheffield United
On the final day of the 2009 Summer transfer window, Stewart held talks with Sheffield United over a possible move to the Bramall Lane club. The deal was finalised later the same day, with Lee Hendrie moving in the opposite direction. Stewart made his début for the Blades a few days later in a 1–1 home draw against local rivals Doncaster Rovers. Stewart was largely used as a substitute or as defensive cover for the remainder of the season, playing twenty three times for the Blades.

Skoda Xanthi
Failing to hold down a first team place at Sheffield United he was released from his contract and signed for Super League Greece side Skoda Xanthi in June 2010. Where he joined former teammate Nathan Ellington.

Millwall
Stewart signed a one-year deal with Football League Championship side Millwall on 7 July 2011, after a week-long trial with the club, stating his wish to return from Greece to an English team.

Notts County
Stewart signed a short-term deal with Football League One side Notts County on 6 October 2012, and played later that day against table toppers Tranmere Rovers. He scored his first and only goal for the club in a Football League Trophy tie against former club Sheffield United.

Coventry City
In March 2013 Stewart signed a three-month contract with Football League One side Coventry City. Coventry manager Steven Pressley announced on 30 April 2013 that Stewart's contract would not be renewed. In total, Stewart made six appearances for the club.

San Jose Earthquakes
In July 2013, Stewart signed with Major League Soccer club San Jose Earthquakes.

Phoenix Rising
Stewart moved to USL Championship side Phoenix Rising FC in February 2017.

Personal life
Stewart and his close friend and fellow footballer Joleon Lescott launched a clothing label together in 2012 named LescottStewart.

Career statistics

References

External links

1982 births
Living people
English footballers
English expatriate footballers
Footballers from Birmingham, West Midlands
Leicester City F.C. players
Bristol Rovers F.C. players
Watford F.C. players
Derby County F.C. players
Sheffield United F.C. players
Xanthi F.C. players
Millwall F.C. players
Notts County F.C. players
Coventry City F.C. players
San Jose Earthquakes players
Phoenix Rising FC players
Expatriate footballers in Greece
Expatriate soccer players in the United States
English Football League players
Premier League players
Super League Greece players
Major League Soccer players
USL Championship players
England youth international footballers
England under-21 international footballers
Association football defenders
English expatriate sportspeople in the United States